Tanjung Rambutan (Jawi: تنجوڠ رمبوتن) is a small town in Kinta District, Perak, Malaysia. It is on the Ipoh to Butterworth railway line, at the now-defunct Tanjung Rambutan railway station.

Ulu Kinta Mental Hospital
The Ulu Kinta Mental Hospital or Hospital Bahagia is the oldest mental hospital in Malaysia. It was opened in 1911.
The hospital celebrated its 100th year in 2011. It also has its own museum due to its history.

Due to its fame, Tanjung Rambutan is considered synonymous to the hospital itself.

References

Kinta District
Towns in Perak